Karen Frances Ulane (December 10, 1941 – May 22, 1989) was an American airline pilot who was dismissed by Eastern Airlines after undergoing sex reassignment surgery in 1980. The case Ulane v. Eastern Airlines became the federal legal precedent for transsexual legal status under the Civil Rights Act of 1964.

Life and career
Ulane was born in Chicago, Illinois and graduated from St. Ignatius College Prep. Ulane joined the United States Army and flew combat missions in the Vietnam War from 1964 to 1968, then became a pilot for Eastern Airlines. Following employment with Eastern Airlines, Ulane transitioned and changed her legal name in April 1980.

T.R. Buttion, the Senior Vice President of Flight Operations presented her with a letter of termination on April 24, 1981 that read, "It is our belief that the controversial nature of the operation you have undergone will detract from and prevent any flight crew of which you are a part of from operating in the integrated, coordinated fashion that is necessary to attain the highest degree of safety." The letter also noted that other Eastern pilots would refuse to fly with her.

Ulane  filed a discrimination charge with the Equal Employment Opportunity Commission which resulted in the civil case, Ulane v. Eastern Airlines. In her case against Eastern Airlines, Ulane reported coping with gender dysphoria from the age of 5 or 6. Although she won the case against Eastern, it was overturned on appeal in the U.S. Court of Appeals for the Seventh Circuit.

Ulane died in the crash of a chartered DC-3 she was piloting on a training flight, approximately five miles southwest of DeKalb, Illinois on May 22, 1989. Two others also died in the crash.

Legacy 
The case Ulane v. Eastern Airlines set legal precedent in the United States that transgender identities did not fall under the protection of the Civil Rights Act of 1964, a standing which remained until Centola v. Potter in 2003.

References

External links 
 Ulane v. Eastern Airlines  via Transgender Law and Policy site
Karen F. Ulane Memorial via Experimental Aircraft Association

1941 births
1989 deaths
Accidental deaths in Illinois
American women commercial aviators
Aviators from Illinois
Aviators killed in aviation accidents or incidents in the United States
Commercial aviators
LGBT people from Illinois
Transgender women
Victims of aviation accidents or incidents in 1989
20th-century American women
20th-century American people
20th-century LGBT people